Count Nikita Petrovich Panin (Russian: Граф Ники́та Петро́вич Па́нин; 1770–1837) was an Imperial Russian diplomat, vice-chancellor, and (acting) State Chancellor and Foreign Minister of Russia.  He was a nephew of Count Nikita Ivanovich Panin, son of Petr Ivanovich Panin, son-in-law of Count .  Nikita P. Panin plotted the assassination of Paul I of Russia together with Count Peter Ludwig von der Pahlen and the Russo-Neapolitan Admiral José de Ribas.  Ribas died before the assassination, which was actually carried out on 23 March [O.S. 11 March] 1801 by a band of dismissed officers headed by General Bennigsen, a Hanoverian in the Russian service, and General Yashvil, a Georgian.  The assassination brought Alexander I of Russia to the throne.

Further reading
 Materials for the biography of Count Nikita Petrovich Panin. (1892) (Материалы для жизнеописания графа Никиты Петровича Панина) at Runivers.ru in DjVu and PDF formats

1770 births
1837 deaths
Panin, Petrovich
Panin, Petrovich
Russian Empire regicides
Paul I of Russia